Mompox  may refer to:
 Santa Cruz de Mompox, a town in northern Colombia
 Mompox Province, a historical province of Colombia